The inauguration of Jose P. Laurel as the third president of the Philippines and the first president of the Second Philippine Republic under Japan occurred on October 14, 1943. The inauguration marked the beginning of the first and last term of Laurel as President.

References 

1943 in the Philippines
Philippines in World War II
Presidency of José P. Laurel
Laurel, Jose